Dale G. Schmidt (October 15, 1931 – July 12, 2006) was a member of the Ohio House of Representatives.

References

Republican Party members of the Ohio House of Representatives
1931 births
2006 deaths
20th-century American politicians